Harder Than the Best is a 1979 compilation album by Winston Rodney, also known as Burning Spear, a Jamaican roots reggae singer and musician known for his Rastafari movement messages.

Track listing
"Marcus Garvey"
"Dry And Heavy"
"Throw Down Your Arms"
"Social Living"
"The Invasion (Black Wa-Da-Da)"
"Slavery Days"
"Old Marcus Garvey"
"Man In The Hills"
"The Sun"
"Civilized Reggae"

References 

1979 compilation albums
Burning Spear compilation albums
Island Records compilation albums